Cornești is a city in Ungheni district, in central Moldova, with a population of 3,284 at the 2004 census. It is composed of the city itself, population 2,781, and the village Romanovca, population 503.

History
The Chișinău-Cornești railway was built between 1871 and 1873. On June 1, 1875, the line Cornești-Ungheni was opened and connection to Romania was established. During the interwar period, the city was the seat of Plasa Cornești, in Bălți County, Romania.

References

Cities and towns in Moldova
Beletsky Uyezd
Bălți County (Romania)
Ungheni District